The 2014 WTA Tour was the elite professional tennis circuit organized by the Women's Tennis Association (WTA) for the 2014 tennis season. The 2014 WTA Tour calendar comprises the Grand Slam tournaments (supervised by the International Tennis Federation (ITF)), the WTA Premier tournaments (Premier Mandatory, Premier 5, and regular Premier), the WTA International tournaments, the Fed Cup (organized by the ITF), and the year-end championships (the WTA Tour Championships and the WTA Tournament of Champions). Also included in the 2014 calendar is the Hopman Cup, which was organized by the ITF and did not distribute ranking points.

Schedule 
This is the complete schedule of events on the 2014 calendar, with player progression documented from the quarterfinals stage.
Key

January

February

March

April

May

June

July

August

September

October

November

Statistical information
These tables present the number of singles (S), doubles (D), and mixed doubles (X) titles won by each player and each nation during the season, within all the tournament categories of the 2014 WTA Tour: the Grand Slam tournaments, the year-end championships (the WTA Tour Championships and the Tournament of Champions), the WTA Premier tournaments (Premier Mandatory, Premier 5, and regular Premier), and the WTA International tournaments. The players/nations are sorted by: 1) total number of titles (a doubles title won by two players representing the same nation counts as only one win for the nation); 2) cumulated importance of those titles (one Grand Slam win equalling two Premier Mandatory/Premier 5 wins, one year-end championships win equalling one-and-a-half Premier Mandatory/Premier 5 win, one Premier Mandatory/Premier 5 win equalling two Premier wins, one Premier win equalling two International wins); 3) a singles > doubles > mixed doubles hierarchy; 4) alphabetical order (by family names for players).

Key

Titles won by player

Titles won by nation

Titles information
The following players won their first main circuit title in singles, doubles, or mixed doubles:

The following players defended a main circuit title in singles, doubles, or mixed doubles:

Top 10 entry
The following players entered the top 10 for the first time in their careers:

WTA rankings 
These are the WTA rankings of the top 20 singles players at the current date of the 2014 season. Players with a gold background qualified for the WTA Tour Championships.

Singles

Number 1 ranking

Doubles

Number 1 ranking

Prize money leaders
Serena Williams lead for the 2nd consecutive year, and 5th overall, with the second highest single-season earnings.  Also for the second consecutive season, top-25 players earned over $1,000,000. Sara Errani and Roberta Vinci each made $1,001,168 by playing in doubles tournaments.  It was the 1st time in WTA Tour history a player earned over $1,000,000 in doubles events.

Statistics leaders

Points distribution 
The points distribution was modified for the 2014 season. Main draw rounds usually give a little less points, but there is no change for the champion (W). Points for qualifying rounds (Q) have changed in both directions depending on the tournament category. Points earned in 2013 retain their value until they expire after 52 weeks.

Retirements 
Following is a list of notable players (winners of a main tour title, and/or part of the WTA rankings top 100 (singles) or (doubles) for at least one week) who announced their retirement from professional tennis, became inactive (after not playing for more than 52 weeks), or were permanently banned from playing, during the 2014 season:

Comebacks 
Following are notable players who will come back after retirements during the 2014 WTA Tour season:

Awards
The winners of the 2014 WTA Awards were announced throughout the last two weeks of November.

See also 

 2014 WTA 125K series
 2014 ITF Women's Circuit
 2014 ATP World Tour

References

External links 
 WTA Tour's 2014 match-facts statistics
 
 

 
WTA Tour
WTA Tour seasons